Jesse "Cheese" Hameen II was born in New Haven, Connecticut. He is a jazz drummer, percussionist, mentor, and educator. He plays the drums, and percussion instruments. For over 40 years he has held percussion clinics and workshops. He is a jazz and rock studies instructor for the Neighborhood Music School for eighteen years. He has toured in the United States, Europe, Africa, and the Caribbean.

Early life
Hameen was born in New Haven, Connecticut. He grew up in Dixwell, New Haven. Dixwell was a neighborhood that had a thriving jazz community when Hameen was growing up. He grew up with a love for music coming from a musical gospel family and a background in Afro-Cuban music, R&B, Jazz.

Hameen lived and performed on the West Coast early in his career. In 1966, at the age of 25, he moved back to the East Coast.

Career
He has performed and recorded with artists such as; Tommy Flanagan, Kenny Burrell, Lou Donaldson, Jimmy McGriff, Hank Crawford, Ruth Brown, Charles Earland, Curtis Mayfield, Irene Reid, Gloria Lynne, Bobby Watson, Stanley Turrentine, Jimmy Witherspoon, Grover Washington Jr, Lena Horne, Pharoah Sanders, Curtis Mayfield, Freddie Cole, George Benson, Christian Sands, Donald Smith, Arthur Prysock, George Benson, Etta Jones, George Adams, Talib Kibwe, Paul Brown, Benny Powell, David "Fathead" Newman, Leon Thomas, Little Jimmy Scott, Blue Mitchell, Curtis Fuller, Reuben Wilson, Brook Benton, Rich Goldstein, Rodney Jones (guitarist), Tony Williams, Seleno Clarke, Bonnie Raitt, Major Holley, Doug Carn, Kenny Barron, Bill Easley, Rodney Jones, Tina Fabrique, and others.

He is the president of Inspire Music Recording Company.

He is a founding member of the Jazz Haven, a not-for-profit organization founded in 1996. Jazz Haven promotes the culture of jazz, and the arts in New Haven, Connecticut.

Hameen was a mentor for Christian Sands, when Sands was 12 years old.

Discography
1984 - Rodney Jones / Tommy Flanagan Quartet - My Funny Valentine (LP, Album) Timeless Records 
1985 - "Cheesesteak" - Jimmy McGriff - State of the Art (LP, Album) Milestone Records
1994 - Silver Bells Various - Santa's Bag - An All-Star Jazz Christmas (CD, Comp) Telarc
1994 - Right Turn on Blues - Jimmy McGriff
1994 - Sun Meidia - Midnight Sun (CD, Album) Sumei Records
1998 - Gloria Lynne - This One's On Me (CD, Album) HighNote
2000 - Rodney Jones - My Funny Valentine (CD)
2002 - Christian Sands - Footprints (CD, Album) 
2003 - Irene Reid - Movin' Out (CD) Savant
2004 - Irene Reid - Thanks to You (CD, Album) Savant

	
Writing & Arrangement
1994 - Sun Meidia - Midnight Sun (CD, Album) Sumei Records
2004 - Irene Reid - Thanks to You (CD, Album) Savant

Production
1994 - Sun Meidia - Midnight Sun (CD, Album) Sumei Records
2008 - Sign Of The Times (CD, Album)

References

External links
Mr. Jesse Hameen on where it comes from.
Jesse Hameen - Playlist
What Makes NMS a Wonderful Place in the eyes of Jesse Hameen II
 Unsung heroes 

Living people
American jazz educators
Bebop drummers
African-American drummers
American jazz drummers
Hard bop drummers
20th-century American drummers
American male drummers
African-American jazz musicians
Jazz musicians from Connecticut
20th-century American male musicians
American male jazz musicians
Year of birth missing (living people)
20th-century African-American musicians
21st-century African-American people